The mixed doubles tournament of the 2019 Badminton Asia Junior Championships will be held from 24 to 28 July. Guo Xinwa / Liu Xuanxuan from China clinched this title in the last edition.

Seeds
Seeds were announced on 2 July.

 Leo Rolly Carnando / Indah Cahya Sari Jamil (champions)
 Feng Yanzhe / Lin Fangling (final)
 Jiang Zhenbang / Li Yijing (semifinals)
 Ki Dong-ju / Lee Eun-ji (third round)
 Dwiki Rafian Restu / Nita Violina Marwah (third round)
 Sirawit Sothon / Pornnicha Suwatnodom (quarterfinals)
 Ratchapol Makkasasithorn / Peeraya Khantaruangsakul (third round)
 Zheng Xunjin / Keng Shuliang (second round)

Draw

Finals

Top half

Section 1

Section 2

Bottom half

Section 3

Section 4

References

External links 
Main Draw

2019 Badminton Asia Junior Championships
Asia Junior